Dichotomyctere erythrotaenia, or the red-striped toadfish, is a species of pufferfish native to Indonesia and Papua New Guinea where it is found most often in brackish water environments.  This species grows to a length of  TL.

References

Tetraodontidae
Fish described in 1853